The Church of St Catherine is a Roman Catholic parish church that serves the village of Żurrieq.

History
The original parish church of Żurrieq is first mentioned in 1436 by Bishop Senatore de Mello who was commissioned to do an inventory of the parish churches in Malta. The church was mentioned again in 1575, in a report by inquisitor Pietro Dusina. Considering the increase in the village population, in 1630 the then parish priest, Antonio Demos, started to plan for the building of a new church. The building started in 1632-1633 under the direction of Reverend Matteolo Saliba, who was also the architect of the new church. The church  was completed in 1658 after 25 years.

The church is listed on the National Inventory of the Cultural Property of the Maltese Islands.

Works of art
The church includes a number of paintings by Mattia Preti. These include the Martyrdom of Saint Stephen, Martyrdom of Saint Andrew, Martyrdom of Saint Catherine of Alexandria, Eternal Father, Visitation of the Virgin to Saint Elizabeth, Saint Roch, Saint Blaise, Saint Dominic, Saint Nicholas of Tolentino and of Our Lady of Graces. The Church also includes a painting of Our Lady of Mount Carmel by Antonio Zammit inaugurated in 1908. The titular statue of St Catherine of Alexandria, dating from 1818, was made by Marjanu Gerada. Another statue is that of Our Lady of Mount Carmel made by Salvu Psaila and finished in 1842.

See also

Culture of Malta
History of Malta
List of Churches in Malta
Religion in Malta
Culture in Malta

References

Roman Catholic churches in Żurrieq
17th-century Roman Catholic church buildings in Malta
National Inventory of the Cultural Property of the Maltese Islands